A hatchet (from the Old French , a diminutive form of hache, 'axe' of Germanic origin) is a single-handed striking tool with a sharp blade on one side used to cut and split wood, and a hammerhead on the other side.  Hatchets may also be used for hewing when making flattened surfaces on logs; when the hatchet head is optimized for this purpose it is called a hewing hatchet.

Although hand axe and hatchet are often used interchangeably, they are not the same thing. A hand axe is essentially a miniature axe with a flat butt or poll on the back side of the head, whereas a hatchet has a hammerhead on the back.

Hatchets can do some work of a pocketknife when one is not present, or create fire through sparks and friction when a lighter is not.

"Burying the hatchet" is a phrase meaning "making peace", attributed to an Iroquois tradition of hiding or putting away a tomahawk after a peace agreement.

"Hatchet" was used to describe a battle axe in Middle English.

References

 "What is a Hatchet Used For? – Ultimate Hatchet Uses Guide"

Axes